André Melo Bandeira Almeida Sousa (born 25 February 1986) is a Portuguese futsal player who plays for Benfica and the Portugal national team as a goalkeeper.

Honours
Fundão
Taça de Portugal: 2013–14

Sporting CP
Campeonato Nacional: 2015–16, 2016–17, 2017–18
Taça de Portugal: 2015–16, 2017–18, 2018–19
Taça da Liga: 2016–17
Supertaça de Portugal: 2017, 2018
UEFA Futsal Champions League: 2018–19

Benfica
Taça da Liga: 2019–20, 2022–23

International
UEFA Futsal Championship: 2018, 2022
FIFA Futsal World Cup: 2021
 Futsal Finalissima: 2022

References

External links
Sporting CP profile

1986 births
Living people
Sportspeople from Coimbra
Futsal goalkeepers
Portuguese men's futsal players
Instituto D. João V players
Sporting CP futsal players
S.L. Benfica futsal players